Preauricular sinuses and preauricular cysts are two common congenital malformations.  Each involves the external ear. The difference between them is that a cyst does not connect with the skin, but a sinus does.  Frequency of preauricular sinus differs depending the population: 0.1–0.9% in the US, 0.9% in the UK, and 4–10% in Asia and parts of Africa.

Preauricular sinuses are inherited features, and frequently appear next to both ears. Preauricular sinuses can be associated with other defects that are not visible, one example being branchio-oto-renal syndrome.

Presentation

Complications 
Occasionally a preauricular sinus or cyst can become infected. Most preauricular sinuses are asymptomatic, and remain untreated unless they become infected too often. Preauricular sinuses can be excised surgically, but often present a high risk of recurrence.

Causes 
Preauricular sinuses and cysts result from developmental defects of the first and second pharyngeal arches. This and other ear malformations are sometimes associated with renal anomalies.  In rare circumstances these pits may be seen in genetic conditions such as branchio-oto-renal syndrome; however these conditions are always concurrent with other health concerns.

Treatment 
Courses of treatment typically include the following:

 Surgical excision is indicated with recurrent fistular infections, preferably after significant healing of the infection. In case of a persistent infection, infection drainage is performed during the excision operation. The operation is generally performed by an appropriately trained specialist surgeon e.g. an otolaryngologist or a specialist General Surgeon. 
 The fistula can be excised as a cosmetic operation even though no infection appeared. The procedure is considered an elective operation in the absence of any associated complications.

See also 
 Branchial cleft cyst
 Thyroglossal cyst
 Lachiewicz Sibley syndrome
 List of cutaneous conditions

References

Bibliography

Further reading

External links 

Cutaneous congenital anomalies
Congenital disorders of ears
Cysts